Melanie Yazzie is a Navajo sculptor, painter, printmaker, and professor. She teaches at the University of Colorado at Boulder.

Early life and education
Yazzie was born in 1966 in Ganado, Arizona, United States. She grew up on the Navajo Nation. Melanie Yazzie is of the Salt Water Clan born for the Bitter Water Clan.

She first studied art at the Westtown School in Pennsylvania. Yazzie earned a BA in Studio Art with a minor in Spanish from Arizona State University in 1990 and an MFA in printmaking from the University of Colorado at Boulder in 1993.

Artwork
Melanie Yazzie works a wide range of media that include printmaking, painting, sculpting, and ceramics, as well as installation art. Her art is accessible to the public on many levels and the main focus is on connecting with people and educating people about the contemporary status of one indigenous woman and hoping that people can learn from her experience.

Her subject matter is significant because the serious undertones reference native post-colonial dilemmas. Melanie's work focuses primarily on themes of indigenous people. Her work often brings images of women from many indigenous cultures to the forefront. Thus her work references matrilineal systems and points to the possibility of female leadership. There are many layers to the works and with in the story layers many discover that our history is varied and deep. It is made clear that there are many indigenous peoples in the world and we all have different stories and it sometimes has a sad connection to mainstream society. Often misunderstood and overlooked are the ways in which we can all learn from each other and make a better world. Yazzie also  collaborates with other indigenous nation artists to increase further cognizance and create shared experiences through art practice about indigenous people.

A recurring motif in some of Yazzie's work has been Blue Bird flour sacks, which provided clothing material to many people during their childhoods. The flour sacks are also known to be used for table cloths, food protection, curtains in hogan homes. The Blue Bird flour sacks are an essential icon from Yazzie's childhood. They serve as a connection to her grandparents and also a connection to memories of butchering sheep, a time honored event with her family while growing up.

Yazzie is known for her multilayered monotypes that focus on storytelling and reflect her dreamtime friends and companions. The works are filled with colors and textures that reflect different world. The works are made with stencils and often she is printing with soy based inks called Akua inks that are safe for the artist and the environment. The works most often are printed on Arches 88 due to the absorbing quality of that 100% rag paper. It is a fine art paper made in France and very soft to the touch. It is a paper designed originally for screen printing but is the perfect surface for many of the works Yazzie creates. The works often are monotypes as opposed to monoprints. So the works are a one of a kind work of art and not made in multiples. The monotypes are often what she creates on travels to various printmaking studios worldwide in which she shares these techniques and sometimes collaborates with other indigenous artists worldwide.

Career

Teaching 
She is a Professor and Head of Printmaking at the University of Colorado at Boulder. She teaches printmaking courses and travels extensively to indigenous communities within the United States and abroad. She can always be found through the University of Colorado Art and Art History Department.

In addition to teaching at the Institute of American Indian Arts, the College of Santa Fe (now Santa Fe University of Art and Design), Boise State University, and the University of Arizona, Yazzie has taught at the Pont Aven School of Contemporary Art in France.

Printmaking 
Yazzie has led over 100 international print exchanges over a 20-year time period. Many of these exchanges include artists from Siberia, Japan, New Zealand, Australia, Canada, Mexico, and Germany.  These international print exchanges examine many issues relevant our current day societies and the invited artists are asked to respond to the issues or themes in making their work for a these exchanges. These projects are community building events that help people connect over large distances and often they are also used as teaching tools in art studios across the globe.

Some of the projects are held in the Artist Printmaker Research Collection at Texas Tech University in Lubbock, TX. It is an excellent resource for researching many artists in the contemporary printmaking scene. Other projects can be seen by visiting the University of Colorado at Boulder Special Collections located in the university library.

In 2012, the Denver Art Museum welcomed Yazzie as artist-in-residence, making her the first in the Native Arts department.

Exhibitions 
A selection of major exhibitions from the 1990s to present include "Between Two Worlds" (2008) at Arizona State University,  "Traveling" at the Heard West Museum (2006), "About Face: Self-Portraits by Native American, First Nations, and Inuit Artists" at the Wheelwright Museum (2005), "Making Connections" (2002) in Bulova, Russia, "Navajo in Gisborne" (1999) in Gisborne, New Zealand and "Watchful Eyes" (1994) at the Heard Museum.

In September 2013 she co-curated the exhibition "Heart Lines: Expressions of Native North American Art" in Colorado University Art Museum, partially based on her private collection and including her work "Pollen Girl".

In February 2014 she opened the largest retrospective of her work in 20 years at the University of New Mexico Art Museum titled Geographies of Memory curated by Lisa Tamiris Becker, Director of the UNM Art Museum. The exhibit ran through May 2014. A beautiful catalogue was published for the exhibition.

Yazzie's solo show, “Histories Beyond Homeland,” opened on October 8, 2015, at the University of Denver Museum of Anthropology. This exhibit consists of Yazzie's depiction of landscape drawings, drawn from the perspective of someone looking down at the earth. Works displayed use guache, an opaque substance similar to watercolor paint, and handmade paper, in these aerial view interpretations.

The Wheelwright Museum of the American Indian in Santa Fe, New Mexico opened a solo show entitled "Memory Weaving:Works by Melanie Yazzie" in May 2018. The exhibit continued through October 6, 2018. » Memory Weaving: Works by Melanie Yazzie

Selected Public Collections
Her work is in the New Mexico Museum of Art, Rhode Island School of Design, Print Collection, Providence, the Museum of Contemporary Native Art in Santa Fe, New Mexico, the Kennedy Museum of Art, Art Collection, Ohio University, Athens, Ohio, Rhodes University, Print Collection, Grahamstown, South Africa, City of Boulder, Colorado Boulder Arts + Culture, New Mexico Arts in Public Places, Art in Embassies: US Department of State, Smithsonian Institution, National Museum of the American Indian, Washington, D.C.

Bibliography 
She is included in books by Zena Pearlstone (About Face), Lucy Lippard (The Lure of the Local) and Jackson Rushing (Native American Art in the Twentieth Century).

References

External links

 University of Colorado Faculty Profile
 ArtNet
 The Moth | The Art and Craft of Storytelling
 Glenn Green Galleries 

Living people
1966 births
People from Ganado, Arizona
Arizona State University alumni
University of Colorado Boulder alumni
Native American sculptors
Native American painters
Native American printmakers
Navajo artists
Painters from Colorado
Institute of American Indian Arts faculty
College of Santa Fe faculty
Boise State University faculty
University of Arizona faculty
University of Colorado Boulder faculty
American women painters
Painters from Arizona
20th-century American women artists
American women printmakers
20th-century American printmakers
Native American women artists
20th-century indigenous painters of the Americas
21st-century American painters
21st-century American printmakers
21st-century indigenous painters of the Americas
21st-century American women artists
Sculptors from Arizona
Sculptors from Colorado
American women academics
Native American women academics
Native American academics
20th-century Native Americans
21st-century Native Americans
20th-century Native American women
21st-century Native American women